The Aix-en-Provence Argonautes are a French American football team based in Aix-en-Provence established in 1986. The team plays in top level Ligue Élite de Football Américain.

History
The team was established in 1986. In their second year, the Argonautes won the title in the second division in France. In 1989 they had their first appearance in the French final which they lost to Paris Castors. The following three years the Argonautes won their first three national championships. From 1989 to 2004 they made it always to the final, in this 16 consecutive the became 8 times French Champions. Their last appearance in the final was in 2006. Six years later the Argonautes have been relegated to the second division.

In 2014 Aix won again the second division title and was promoted to the top first division.

Championships
 Ligue Élite de Football Américain
 Champions: 8 (1990, 1991, 1992, 1995, 1998, 1999, 2001, 2002)
 Runners-up: 9 (1989, 1993, 1994, 1996, 1997, 2000, 2003, 2004, 2006)
 EFL
 Runners-up: 1 (1996)

Notable Players & Coaches

DeAndre Smith QB 1993, Current 2022 New York Giants running backs coach

Larry Legault Head coach 1990-1993

Matt Hove Head coach 2008

Jim Criner Head coach 2009-2010

Ryan Perrilloux QB 2016

References

External links
 Official website

American football teams in France
Aix-en-Provence
Sport in Bouches-du-Rhône
1986 establishments in France
American football teams established in 1986